Glen Tomlinson (born 18 March 1970) is an Australian former professional rugby league footballer who played in the 1990s and 2000s. A stand at Batley Bulldogs' ground, Mount Pleasant is named after Glen Tomlinson.

Club records
Tomlinson scored 124 tries during his two spells with Batley, breaking the Batley club record for tries in a career, which had been set by Wattie Davies way back in 1912, who had scored 122 tries in 448 matches. He held the record until 2006, when he was surpassed by Craig Lingard.

Financial Crisis At Wakefield Trinity Wildcats
In 2000, at the height of a financial crisis at Wakefield Trinity Wildcats, the contracts of all players aged over 24 were terminated during September 2000. The players affected were; Andy Fisher, Bobbie Goulding, Warren Jowitt, Tony Kemp (player-coach), Steve McNamara, Francis Maloney, Martin Masella, Steve Prescott, Bright Sodje, Francis Stephenson and Glen Tomlinson.

References

External links
1999 RUGBY LEAGUE: TEAM-BY-TEAM GUIDE TO SUPER LEAGUE
2001 Super League Team-by-team guide

1970 births
Living people
Australian rugby league players
Australian expatriate sportspeople in England
Batley Bulldogs players
Bradford Bulls players
Hull F.C. players
Place of birth missing (living people)
Rugby league halfbacks
Wakefield Trinity players